Stewart Rhodes (born 1 December 1986 in Orange, New South Wales) is a left hand batting all rounder New Zealand cricketer who plays for the Wellington Firebirds in the Plunket Shield and the New Zealand one-day competition.

References

1986 births
Living people
New Zealand cricketers
Wellington cricketers